Pink Mountaintops is a Canadian rock and roll band from Vancouver led by Stephen McBean. 

The band's first album, The Pink Mountaintops, featured Amber Webber and Joshua Wells. The tracks varied from alt-country to indie rock.

The band's recording Outside Love included contributions from members of several other bands. It was number one on the Canadian campus radio top 50 chart in May and again in June, 2009.

Pink Mountaintop's fourth album, Get Back, was released in 2014. Musicians included Annie Hardy, Greg Foremann, and Rob Barbato. The album was recorded in Los Angeles and produced by Joe Cardamone.

Band members
Stephen McBean

Live: 
Stephen McBean 
Emily Rose 
Kliph Scurlock
Tygh Runyan

Discography

Albums
Pink Mountaintops (Jagjaguwar, 2004)
Axis of Evol (Jagjaguwar, 2006)
Outside Love (Jagjaguwar, 2009)
Get Back (Jagjaguwar, 2014)
Peacock Pools (ATO Records, 2022)

Singles
"The Ones I Love" / "Erected" (Jagjaguwar, 2005)
"Single Life" / "My Best Friend" (Jagjaguwar, 2007)
"Asleep with an Angel" / "The Beat" (Jagjaguwar, 2014)
"Lights of the City" (ATO Records, 2022)
"Nervous Breakdown" (ATO Records, 2022)
 "Nikki Go Sudden" (ATO Records, 2022)

References

External links
Pink Mountaintops Official website
Pink Mountaintops at Jagjaguwar Records
Pink Mountaintops at Exclaim!
"Down and Dirty: The love songs of the Pink Mountaintops" CBC Radio 3 Session; story by Shawn Cooper, photography by Jon Elder

Musical groups established in 2003
Musical groups from Vancouver
Canadian indie rock groups
Canadian psychedelic rock music groups
2003 establishments in British Columbia
Jagjaguwar artists
Low Transit Industries artists